Rigosertib (ON-01910 sodium salt, with Estybon as trade name) is a synthetic benzyl styryl sulfone in development by Onconova Therapeutics. Rigosertib is in phase III clinical trials for the treatment of chronic myelomonocytic leukemia.

Its geometrical isomer (Z)-ON 01910·Na has less cytotoxicity on cancer cells.

Mechanism
Rigosertib is a microtubule-destabilizing agent.

References 

Antineoplastic and immunomodulating drugs
Experimental cancer drugs